New London is a city in Kandiyohi County, Minnesota, United States along the Middle Fork of the Crow River.  The population was 1,251 at the 2010 census. Sibley State Park is nearby. It was named after New London, Wisconsin, by Louis Larson because of the similarity he saw with his previous home there. It was incorporated on April 8, 1889. The city was the temporary county seat of Kandiyohi County from 1867 to 1870.

Geography

Minnesota State Highways 9 and 23 are two of the main routes in the city, and U.S. Route 71 is nearby.

Climate

Demographics

2010 census
As of the census of 2010, there were 1,251 people, 521 households, and 318 families living in the city. The racial makeup of the city was 98.7% White, 0.2% Native American, 0.1% Asian, 0.9% from other races, and 0.2% from two or more races. Hispanic or Latino of any race were 2.7% of the population.

There were 521 households, of which 31.7% had children under the age of 18 living with them, 47.0% were married couples living together, 11.7% had a female householder with no husband present, 2.3% had a male householder with no wife present, and 39.0% were non-families. 34.7% of all households were made up of individuals, and 21.7% had someone living alone who was 65 years of age or older. The average household size was 2.28 and the average family size was 2.97.

The median age in the city was 40.5 years. 25.5% of residents were under the age of 18; 6.8% were between the ages of 18 and 24; 23.4% were from 25 to 44; 19.6% were from 45 to 64; and 24.6% were 65 years of age or older. The gender makeup of the city was 45.9% male and 54.1% female.

2000 census
As of the census of 2000, there were 1,066 people, 415 households, and 261 families living in the city. The racial makeup of the city was 97.75% White, 0.47% Native American, 0.09% Asian, 0.66% from other races, and 1.03% from two or more races. Hispanic or Latino of any race were 1.50% of the population.

There were 415 households, out of which 32.3% had children under the age of 18 living with them, 49.4% were married couples living together, 11.3% had a female householder with no husband present, and 37.1% were non-families. 33.7% of all households were made up of individuals, and 17.1% had someone living alone who was 65 years of age or older.  The average household size was 2.31 and the average family size was 2.95.

In the city, the population was spread out, with 24.3% under the age of 18, 6.4% from 18 to 24, 25.1% from 25 to 44, 17.1% from 45 to 64, and 27.1% who were 65 years of age or older.  The median age was 40 years. For every 100 females, there were 76.2 males.  For every 100 females age 18 and over, there were 71.7 males.

The median income for a household in the city was $34,018, and the median income for a family was $42,500. Males had a median income of $28,636 versus $21,786 for females. The per capita income for the city was $16,216.  About 6.1% of families and 6.8% of the population were below the poverty line, including 4.7% of those under age 18 and 11.6% of those age 65 or over.

Car races
This city is known as the starting point for the New London to New Brighton Antique Car Run, a 120-mile endurance tour for vehicles from 1908 and earlier, or any 1 or 2 cylinder vehicles up to 1915. This event has been held in early to mid-August since 1987. The run goes to New Brighton, Minnesota, and is a reference to the London to Brighton Veteran Car Run from London to Brighton in the United Kingdom.

Music festival
New London has hosted an annual one-day music festival in mid- to late August since the 2000s. The event has featured bluegrass, acoustic and jazz performances.

References

External links
City website

Cities in Minnesota
Cities in Kandiyohi County, Minnesota
Former county seats in Minnesota